In Scots law, an interdict is a court order to stop someone from breaching someone else's rights. They can be issued by the Court of Session or a Sheriff Court. The equivalent term in England is an injunction. A temporary interdict is called an interim interdict. A court will grant an interim interdict if there is a prima facie case and on the balance of convenience the remedy should be granted.  Breaching an interdict can result in a fine or imprisonment.

See also
 Injunction
 Super-injunctions in English law

References

Scots civil law
Scots law legal terminology
Privacy law
Court of Session